is a Japanese professional shogi player, ranked 7-dan.

Early life
Yasuaki Murayama was born on May 9, 1984, in Hino, Tokyo. He learned how to play shogi from his grandfather when he was 5 years old, and won the 20th  in 1995.

Murayama was accepted into the Japan Shogi Association's apprentice school at the rank of 6-kyū as a protegee of shogi professional  in September 1995 and was promoted to the rank of 1-dan in July 1998. Murayama obtained full professional status and the rank of 4-dan in October 2003 for winning the 33rd 3-dan League (April 2003September 2003) with a record of 15 wins and 3 losses.

Shogi professional
Murayama won his first tournament as a professional in October 2007 when he defeated Ryōsuke Nakamura 2 games to none to win the 38th  title. In March 2016, Murayama defeated Shōta Chida to win the 65th NHK Cup Shogi TV Tournament.

In 2015, Murayama was one of five shogi professional selected to play a match against the five top shogi computers in the "Shogi Denousen Final", the final part of the Denou series of matches. Murayama lost Game 4 in 97 moves to Ponanza.

Promotion history
The promotion history for Murayama is as follows:
1995: 6-kyū
1998: 1-dan
2003, October 1: 4-dan
2007, December 14: 5-dan
2012, May 17: 6-dan
2014, March 13: 7-dan

Titles and other championships

Awards and honors
Murayama received the Japan Shogi Association Annual Shogi Awards for "Best New Player" (2007) and "Best Winning Percentage" (2007 and 2013).

References

External links
ShogiHub: Professional Player Info · Murayama, Yasuaki

1984 births
Japanese shogi players
Living people
People from Hino, Tokyo
Professional shogi players
Professional shogi players from Tokyo Metropolis
Shinjin-Ō